Dolly Ahluwalia is an Indian fashion designer and actress. She been awarded the  National Film Award for Best Costume Design twice, for Bandit Queen in (1996) and Haider in (2015). She won the Filmfare Awards three times, for Omkara (2007), Bhaag Milkha Bhaag (2014) and Haider (2015).

National Film Awards

Filmfare Awards
The Filmfare Awards are one of the oldest and most prestigious Hindi film awards. They are presented annually by The Times Group for excellence of cinematic achievements. Dolly has three awards, the most awarded in this category.

Zee Cine Awards

IIFA Awards

Genie Awards

Screen Awards

Producers Guild Film Awards

Screen Weekly Awards

Times of India Awards

References

Ahluwalia, Dolly
Ahluwalia, Dolly